Timothy Ryan Bulman (born October 31, 1982) is a former American football defensive end of the National Football League (NFL). He was originally signed by the Arizona Cardinals as an undrafted free agent in 2005. He played for Boston College.

College career 
Bulman played 49 games for Boston College, started 21 times and made 160 tackles (111 solos) with 10.5 sacks, 38 stops for losses and 36 quarterback pressures, and caused and recovered two fumbles, blocked a kick and batted away 17 passes He was Second-team All-Big East Conference choice as a senior in 2004. As a senior, he received BC's Scanlan Award, the highest honor awarded to a Boston College football player for all-around excellence as an athlete, scholar and member of the community. He was named tri-captain of the team in 2004.

Professional career

Arizona Cardinals
Bulman was signed by the Arizona Cardinals as an undrafted free agent on April 25, 2005.  As a rookie free agent, attended training camp with the Cardinals before being released and then signed to the practice squad. He was promoted from the practice squad after injuries decimated the defensive line and played significantly the rest of the season. He was released by Cardinals on September 2, 2006.

Houston Texans
Bulman was signed to Houston Texans practice squad on October 10, 2006 and activated from Texans' practice squad on December 23, 2006. He had no statistics in 2006. In 2007, he played two games with the Texans and made 3 tackles. In 2008, he played 14 games with no starts. He recorded the second highest recording of sacks with 4. He was released on September 14, 2011 to make room on the roster for wide receiver David Anderson. He was re-signed on September 16.

New England Patriots
On July 25, 2012, Bulman signed a one-year deal with the New England Patriots. He was released on August 27, 2012.

Post-playing career
In 2012, Bulman and his brother founded Incremental Development, a Boston-based commercial real-estate acquisition company.

References

External links
New England Patriots bio
Houston Texans bio
Boston College Eagles bio

1982 births
Living people
American football defensive tackles
Boston College Eagles football players
Boston College High School alumni
Arizona Cardinals players
Houston Texans players
People from Milton, Massachusetts
Players of American football from Massachusetts
American real estate businesspeople